The 2015 Individual Speedway Junior World Championship was the 39th edition of the FIM World motorcycle speedway Under-21 Championships.

It was staged over three rounds, at Lonigo, Lublin and Pardubice. The competition was won by Bartosz Zmarzlik, who finished five points ahead of Denmark's Anders Thomsen, despite not winning any of the three rounds to be held. Thomsen finished second after winning a run-off with compatriot Mikkel Michelsen, who won at Lonigo and Pardubice but struggled at Lublin and was unable to catch Zmarzlik, who finished on the podium at each of the rounds. Paweł Przedpełski was the winner on home soil at Lublin.

Final series

Classification 
The meeting classification was according to the points scored during the meeting, with the total points scored by each rider during each meeting credited as World Championship points. The FIM Speedway Under 21 World Champion was the rider who collected most World Championship points at the end of the series. In case of a tie between one or more riders in the final overall classification, a run-off decided the 1st, 2nd and 3rd places. For all other placings, the better-placed rider in the last meeting was the better placed rider.

See also 
 2015 Speedway Grand Prix
 2015 Team Speedway Junior World Championship

References 

 
2015
World Individual Junior